Lonhuda pottery produced by the Lonhuda Pottery Company of Steubenville, Ohio was a pottery business founded in 1892 by William Long (1844–1918) with investors W.H. Hunter and Alfred Day. The pottery business utilized underglaze faience. It is known for brown underglaze and slip-decoration. The firm closed in 1896. Marks vary and include the letters LPCO and the Lonhuda name above a feathered head.

The ceramicist Laura Anne Fry worked for Lonhuda in 1892–93.

See also
Weller pottery

References

American art pottery